Guy Dolhats (born 14 October 1952) is a French former professional racing cyclist. His sporting career began with ACBB Paris. He rode in the 1976 Tour de France.

References

External links
 

1952 births
Living people
French male cyclists
Sportspeople from Landes (department)
Cyclists from Nouvelle-Aquitaine
20th-century French people